Graybar is an American wholesale electrical, communications and data networking products distribution business, which also supplies related supply-chain management and logistics services.  Based in Clayton, Missouri, the employee-owned corporation is included on the Fortune 500 list of the largest United States corporations.

The Graybar Electric Company was incorporated on December 11, 1925, as the successor company of the general electric supply business of the Western Electric Company, which was founded in 1869 in Cleveland, Ohio, by Elisha Gray and Enos M. Barton. The separation of product lines was intended to provide a separate identity from the telephone supply function of Western Electric to the Bell System, given its importance as the largest merchandiser of electrical apparatus and related equipment in the world in the 1920s.

History

Early history
During the post-Civil War Reconstruction Era, entrepreneur Enos M. Barton (who had served as a telegrapher during the war) worked for Western Union in Rochester, New York. During this period, Barton met George Shawk, the foreman of the company's Cleveland, Ohio shop. When that shop was closed down, Shawk bought some of the equipment and went into business for himself, making various kinds of electrical and other apparatus, including inventor's models. While on a trip to Rochester, he and Barton, who was then 26, agreed to go into partnership.

To raise the $400 her son needed for his share of the business venture, Barton's widowed mother mortgaged her home.

The new firm, located at 93 St. Clair Street in Cleveland, grew. In May 1869, Elisha Gray, an Oberlin College professor and inventor of telegraphic equipment, bought out Shawk's interest.

Up until then, Gray had been one of the firm's top customers. He had invented a needle annunciator for hotels and elevators, a telautograph (a machine for the electrical transmission of writing), and the telegraph answer-back call box. Gray and Barton joined forces with an investment of $2,500 each, with Gray as the senior partner. The success of the new company attracted the attention of General Anson Stager, general superintendent of the Western Union Telegraph Company. He offered to enter the business as an equal partner with Gray and Barton, providing the company's headquarters was moved from Cleveland to Chicago, Illinois. In December 1869, the company moved to 162 S. Water Street, Chicago. The great Great Chicago Fire in 1871 came within two blocks of its small plant.

The destruction caused by the fire resulted in greater growth for Gray & Barton, as the company sold fire alarms and helped rebuild the Western Union infrastructure in the city.

Incorporation as Western Electric

After several relocations, all in Chicago, the business was incorporated as the Western Electric Manufacturing Company in 1872 to meet the capital requirements of the telegraph supply business. The new company so closely allied with the elder Western that three of its five directors were Western Union executives. Moreover, Stager was named president, although it was Barton as secretary/treasurer who actually handled day-to-day affairs.

Although the young firm thrived in the telegraph industry, it was not until the invention of the telephone by Alexander Graham Bell in 1876, and the incandescent lamp by Thomas Alva Edison in 1879, that Western Electric began to gain stature as a large company.

Part-owner Gray held the title of company electrician and spent his days working on his inventions, becoming increasingly less involved in the operations of the shop, and eventually he sold his interest in Western Electric in 1875 and retired to pursue independent research and to teach at Oberlin College. In 1876, he filed a caveat with the U.S. Patent Office, announcing his intention to soon patent an invention that would transmit vocal sounds telegraphically. Gray dubbed his telephone "the harmonic telegraph". Only hours earlier, however, Alexander Graham Bell applied for a patent for the same idea, which became known as the telephone. As it turned out, what Bell actually patented would have never worked, while Gray's idea would have. Western Union acquired both Gray's and Edison's telephone patents to challenge the American Bell Telephony Company (renamed AT&T in 1899), which led to a patent infringement suit and Bell ultimately being named the inventor of the telephone. Therefore it was Bell's patent and not Gray’s that launched the telecommunications industry.

As applications of electricity broadened, Western Electric not only sold the electric bells and batteries, telegraph keys, fire alarm boxes and hotel annunciators it originally manufactured, but also many items it purchased from other manufacturers.

Stager served as president of Western Electric until shortly before his death in 1885, and Barton then served as president from 1886 to 1908.

Western Electric Company was the first company to join in a Japanese joint venture with foreign capital. It invested in Nippon Electric Company in 1899. Western Electric held 54% of NEC at the time. Their representative in Japan was Walter Tenney Carleton.

By the turn of the century, Western Electric had become the main producer of telephone equipment in the United States. It also manufactured arc lamps, lighting equipment and power apparatus, ranging from small fans to huge motors and generators. Alongside manufacturing, the distribution business continued to grow, handling an extensive line of electrical supplies such as wire, conduit, wiring devices and pole line material.

By the 1910s, the company became the world’s largest distributor and the United States’ leading wholesaler of electrical supplies. These facts attracted investment by the American Bell Telephone Company, which also discovered that Gray and Barton could purchase supplies and sell them to the telephone companies more efficiently than the companies could acquire the supplies themselves.

A chain of warehouses was established across the nation, and the growth of the distributing business continued to increase through World War I and into the post-war period.

Formation of Graybar

On December 31, 1920, the supply department of Western Electric was divided by forming operating divisions for general electrical supplies and telephone equipment. In 1923, the general supply business opened separate general offices in the newly constructed Pershing Square Building in New York City.

Scores of electrical supply manufacturers were using the company's distribution network, and business relationships were formed. Some of these relationships, such as with General Electric and the Square D Company, are more than a century old and still exist today. Having become the largest merchandizer of electrical supplies in the world and close to fifty distributing houses in the United States, the division was incorporated as a separate entity on December 11, 1925 with the name Graybar Electric Company, in honor of Western's original founders, Elisha Gray and Enos Barton.

Albert Salt, in the 1920s, was Western Electric's Vice President of purchasing and became responsible for leading Graybar and established Graybar's first New York corporate office on the world's largest office building.

On January 1, 1927, Western Electric's holdings in Graybar were transferred to Electric Research Holdings, a Western Electric company. Graybar was sold to the Graybar Management Corporation on December 31, 1928, a company held by the employees of Graybar, who purchased their shares for its capitalized value of $9 million, which consisted of $3 million in cash and $6 million in cumulative preferred stock.

During the 1930s, the company explored many avenues of income, including a line of appliances and sewing machines under the Graybar brand. By 1941 the company's sales volume was more than $100 million, the number of distribution houses had jumped to 86, and there was a corresponding increase in personnel. Also that year, the remaining outstanding shares of stock were purchased from Western Electric with a $1 million check signed by Graybar President Frank A. Ketcham.

When the country entered World War II, Graybar's ingenuity and knowledge of logistics proved to be of immeasurable value in providing war-needed goods. Graybar became a vital link between America's manufacturers and America's defense needs. Defense-related business continued in the postwar era, with Graybar again aiding the military during the subsequent Korean War and Vietnam War. Overall the company enjoyed strong growth in the years following World War II, its momentum not checked until the recession of the mid-1970s, which led to Graybar slashing its workforce by 20%. As a result, when economic conditions improved in the 1980s Graybar was unable to gear up quickly enough to meet the rising demand for electrical products.

The corporate headquarters moved from the Graybar Building in New York City to Clayton, Missouri in 1982.

Recent years

Graybar modernized its infrastructure, implementing one of the first computer-to-computer ordering systems, but a weak real estate market and slowdown in construction began to take its toll on the bottom line. Revenues, which had approached $1.5 billion in 1980, improved to just $1.89 billion in 1990, then fell to $1.74 billion in 1991, prompting the closure of some regional offices and another reduction in the workforce. Aside from a weak economy, it was also becoming clear to management that Graybar suffered from internal problems; the company was losing market share on its traditional electrical business while unable to make desired progress on the newer communications/data products.

Business improved as the economy recovered in the early 1990s. Despite sales growing to $2.3 billion in 1994, management decided to realign the business starting in January 1995, forming two business groups, one for electrical supplies and another devoted to the increasingly important comm/data business. That same year, Graybar formed the Solutions Providers Alliance, teaming up with wholesale distributors Kaman Industrial Technologies, WWR Scientific Products, and Vallen Corporation. To accommodate an aggressive new growth strategy, Graybar added 45 locations, 2,400 employees, and 350 salespeople from 1994 to 1999. It also improved its network of warehouses, spending $144 million to construct 16 major new facilities that dramatically cut down on delivery time. As a result of these investments, the company was well positioned to take advantage of a strong economy in the final years of the 1990s. In 1999 annual revenues topped $4.2 billion, while profits almost doubled during this period, improving from $36 million in 1995 to $64 million in 1999. The improvement in the comm/data sector was of particular importance. In 1991 it accounted for just 17 percent of Graybar sales, but by 1999 totaled 38 percent.
Graybar engaged in some external growth, making several acquisitions in 1999 and 2000, the largest being Splane Electric Supply Co., a Detroit, Michigan, company with $30 million in annual sales, 70 employees, and six locations. In 2000 Graybar revenues improved to $5.2 billion, while net income topped $66.2 million. To support further expansion of its nationwide distribution centers, instrumental to the company's growth, Graybar placed a $100 million bond offering in the summer of 2001, the largest financing effort in its history. By this time nine of the 16 distribution centers started in 1997 were operational and the remaining seven were only months away from opening. Once the system was in place, Graybar was able to achieve its long-term aim of being able to ship to customers within 24 hours throughout the United States.

A downturn in the economy, however, soon hurt business and forced management to fine-tune the company's strategy. In 2001 revenues fell to $4.8 billion and business continued to drop off in 2002 and 2003 to $3.99 billion and $3.78 billion, respectively. As it had done in the early 1990s, Graybar opted to invest in its infrastructure in order to be ready to take advantage of the economy when it ultimately rebounded. The company invested $90 million on new technology to provide customers with more detailed information on orders, deliveries, and payments. At the same time, it encouraged its 4,100 suppliers to implement a standardized bar code system to create an open, central database similar to that found in the retail industry. In this way, Graybar would distinguish itself from its rivals, graduating from the role of middleman to a supply chain expert capable of adding value to the process. Once the new system was functional, Graybar hoped to be able to sell detailed reports to both suppliers and customers in the then $73 billion electrical supply industry.

Graybar's revenues had increased to $4.1 billion in 2004, $4.3 billion in 2005, and $5 billion in 2006.

Today, Graybar operates a network of more than 260 locations throughout the United States, Canada and Puerto Rico as well as authorized agents around the world. Graybar Electric Company, Inc. is engaged in the distribution of electrical, communications and data networking products and the provision of related supply services primarily to electrical and comm/data contractors, industrial plants, federal, state and local governments, commercial users, telephone companies and power utilities in North America. All the products Graybar sells are purchased from others. The products distributed by the company consist primarily of wire and cable, lighting fixtures, power distribution equipment, comm/data products for wide and local area networks, conduit, boxes and fittings, wiring devices, motor controls, industrial automation, lamps, industrial enclosures, tools and test equipment, station apparatus, fuses and transformers.

Sales for 2007 were more than $5.25 billion, positioning Graybar at #455 on the Fortune 500 listing and #55 for privately held companies. From January 1 to June 30, 2008, Graybar posted profit of $47.4 million on revenue of $2.7 billion for the six-month period, up from a profit of $39.7 million, on revenue of $2.6 billion for the same period in 2007. In 2008 Graybar was named the ”most admired” Fortune 500 company in the "diversified wholesalers" category. In 2008, Graybar rose to the #439 spot on the Fortune 500 listing. Sales for 2009 were $4.4 billion, positioning Graybar at #439 on the Fortune 500 listing and #64 on Forbes List of America’s Largest Private Companies.

In 2010, Graybar had a healthy revenue growth and sales rose to $4.6 billion, a 5.4% increase from 2009. Net income of $42.3 million meant a 12.9% increase from the previous year.

Graybar finished 2011 with net sales of $5.37 billion, a 16.4% increase compared to 2010. The company also reported net income of $81.4 million, up 93.9% from the previous year. Graybar was listed as #451 on the 2012 Fortune 500 listing and was ranked #69 on the Forbes America's Largest Private Companies list in 2011.

Graybar finished 2012 with net sales of $5.4 billion and reported net income of $86.6 million. Graybar ranked No. 465 on the 2013 Fortune 500 ranking of America's largest companies and was ranked No.1 in the "diversified wholesalers" industry category on the 2013 Fortune World's Most Admired Companies list.

In 2013, Graybar finished the year with net sales of $5.7 billion and net income of $81.1 million.  Sales for 2014 were $6 billion, with net income of $87.4 million.  Sales in 2015 hit a record $6.1 billion, with record net income of $91.1 million.  In 2015, Graybar also acquired Advantage Industrial Automation in Duluth, Georgia.

Graybar is an independent distributor and is still one of the largest employee-owned companies in the United States.

In 2017, Graybar started an innovation lab in Champaign - Illinois. Graybar’s Innovation Lab (iLab) sits at the intersection of industry and academia. The iLab is located in Research Park—a diverse ecosystem of other Fortune 500 companies, small to medium size firms, and a vibrant start-up community—on the campus of the University of Illinois at Urbana-Champaign (UIUC).

See also
 Graybar Electric Company Building (Detroit, Michigan)

Notes

References
 The Graybar Story, by Graybar Electric Company, Inc., March 2005

External links
 Graybar Home Page

Companies based in St. Louis County, Missouri
Companies established in 1869
Employee-owned companies of the United States
Privately held companies based in Missouri
Industrial supply companies
1869 establishments in Ohio